Meyenia may mean:
 Meyenia, a genus of sponges in the family Spongillidae; synonym of Ephydatia
 Meyenia, a genus of flowering plants in the family Acanthaceae; synonym of Thunbergia